Karl Schlewer (15 March 1901 – 27 November 1986), known as Charles Schlewer, was a French rower. He competed at the 1920 Summer Olympics in Antwerp with the men's eight where they were eliminated in the semi-finals.

References

1901 births
1986 deaths
French male rowers
Olympic rowers of France
Rowers at the 1920 Summer Olympics
Sportspeople from Strasbourg
European Rowing Championships medalists